Pichia subpelliculosa is a plant pathogen infecting strawberries.

References

External links

Fungal strawberry diseases
Fungi described in 1984
Saccharomycetaceae